Jahvon Quinerly (born November 25, 1998) is an American college basketball player for the Alabama Crimson Tide of the Southeastern Conference (SEC). He previously played for the Villanova Wildcats. Quinerly attended Hudson Catholic Regional High School, where he was a consensus five-star recruit.

High school career
Quinerly attended Hudson Catholic Regional High School in Jersey City, New Jersey. In his final two seasons, he earned back-to-back Gatorade New Jersey Boys Basketball Player of the Year honors. He was named to the West roster for the 2018 McDonald's All-American Boys Game, playing against high school teammate Louis King.

Recruiting
On August 8, 2017, Quinerly committed to play college basketball for Arizona, but he reopened his recruitment in October after federal documents suggested that he had taken a $15,000 bribe from the team's assistant coach Emanuel Richardson, who had been arrested during the 2017–18 NCAA basketball corruption scandal. On February 14, 2018, despite strong recruitment efforts from Oklahoma, he committed to Villanova.

College career

Villanova
Entering Quinerly's freshman season, Villanova lost several key players to the NBA draft after winning the 2018 NCAA tournament. Quinerly was the program's top recruit in the 2018 class and was expected to replace Jalen Brunson, the reigning national player of the year. In his debut on November 6, 2018, Quinerly recorded three points and three assists, shooting 1-of-4 from the field, in 17 minutes versus Morgan State. On December 12, after receiving under 10 minutes of playing time or not playing for six straight games, he posted to an Instagram story that Villanova was his "2nd choice for a reason." Quinerly soon deleted the post before posting random pictures and soon deleting his account. The incident drew speculation that he was attempting to pretend that his account had been hacked. On December 13, he apologized for his controversial post. Through 25 games, Quinerly averaged 3.2 points in 9.1 minutes per game. On April 3, 2019, he announced that he would transfer from Villanova.

Alabama
On June 2, 2019, Quinerly committed to Alabama after also considering Pittsburgh. He sat out for his next year due to transfer rules. In his debut on November 25, 2020, Quinerly posted 18 points, one rebound and three assists in an 81–57 win against Jacksonville State. He was named SEC tournament MVP after leading Alabama to the title. On March 22, 2021, Quinerly recorded 14 points, 11 assists and five rebounds in a 96–77 win over Maryland in the second round of the NCAA tournament. He suffered a knee injury in a NCAA Tournament loss to Notre Dame as a junior. Quinerly averaged 14.3 points, 4.3 assists and 3.1 rebounds per game.

Career statistics

College

|-
| style="text-align:left;"| 2018–19
| style="text-align:left;"| Villanova
| 25 || 0 || 9.1 || .337 || .250 || .733 || .8 || .9 || .2 || .0 || 3.2
|-
| style="text-align:left;"| 2019–20
| style="text-align:left;"| Alabama
| style="text-align:center;" colspan="11"|  Redshirt
|-
| style="text-align:left;"| 2020–21
| style="text-align:left;"| Alabama
| 30 || 7 || 25.0 || .478 || .433 || .689 || 2.2 || 3.2 || .6 || .0 || 12.9
|-
| style="text-align:left;"| 2021–22
| style="text-align:left;"| Alabama
| 33 || 27 || 30.0 || .411 || .281 || .740 || 3.0 || 4.2 || .7 || .2 || 13.8
|- class="sortbottom"
| style="text-align:center;" colspan="2"| Career
| 88 || 34 || 22.4 || .429 || .329 || .720 || 2.1 || 2.9 || .5 || .1 || 10.5

Personal life
Quinerly is a member of the basketball collective "Jelly Fam" centered around flashy finger roll layups, which he helped create with prominent high school player Isaiah Washington. His younger brother, Jaden, is a walk-on basketball player at Alabama.

References

External links
Alabama Crimson Tide bio
Villanova Wildcats bio
USA Basketball bio

1998 births
Living people
American men's basketball players
Basketball players from New Jersey
McDonald's High School All-Americans
Point guards
Sportspeople from Hackensack, New Jersey
Villanova Wildcats men's basketball players
Alabama Crimson Tide men's basketball players